Tuomo Town is the headquarters of Tuomo Clan which is situated in present-day Burutu Local Government Area of Delta State, Nigeria. It lies along the Forcados River, popularly known by the Ijaws as Boloutoru. It is made up of three quarters, viz: Foukonou, Akerebunu and Ekeremobiri. Other towns that are in the same clan with Tuomo are: Bolou-Tebegbe and Bolou-Tamibge which later gave birth to Toru-Tebegbe and Toru-Tamigbe in their present settlement along the creek and Torugbene. Ogbobagbene was the youngest town moved out of Akerebunu in Tuomo to settle in the same creek before Toru-Tebegbe due to fishing.

Etymology
The etymology of the word Tuomo (Tuama) means 'grass town' and was the name accorded to the town due to it high level of grasses during the time of settlement.

References

Arthur Ebikefe. The C.E.O of 

Towns in Delta State